MLB 2003 is a video game based on Major League Baseball. It was developed exclusively for the PlayStation. San Francisco Giants player Barry Bonds was on the cover of the game. MLB 2003 was developed by 989 Sports. According to Metacritic, the game was generally well received amongst critics at 78 out of 100, with user scores being slightly lower at 7.4.

The game was preceded by MLB 2002 and succeeded by MLB 2004.

References

External links
 
 

2002 video games
Major League Baseball video games
North America-exclusive video games
PlayStation (console) games
PlayStation (console)-only games
Video games developed in the United States
Video games set in 2003